Johannes Gerardus Nicolaas Venneker (born 5 March 1945) is a Dutch former footballer who played as a forward. A Feijenoord youth product, he made his Eredivisie debut with club and went on to play for NEC Nijmegen, Sparta Rotterdam and French club Montferrand. He also made four appearances for the Netherlands national team. Venneker is the only Feyenoord player to have scored five goals in a match against De Klassieker rivals Ajax Amsterdam.

Career
Venneker was born in Rotterdam. Until the age of 18 he played as a goalkeeper. On 29 November 1964, aged 19, he scored five goals in Feijenoord's 9–4 win in De Klassieker against Ajax Amsterdam. To this day, he is the only Feyenoord player to have achieved this feat.

Following a move to NEC Nijmegen Venneker spent seven years at Sparta Rotterdam. At Sparta, he was deployed in the right-back position by coach Georg Keßler. Later in his time there he also featured for the Netherlands national team, making four appearances.

Personal life
Venneker has two sons with his wife Sylvia. He owned a sports shop called "Venneker Sporting" in Hellevoetsluis.  he lived in Rockanje. In January 2015 it was announced he would take up the role of technical advisor at lower-league club VV Nieuwenhoorn for the 2015–16 season. He successfully underwent heart surgery in September 2020. At the time he was chairman of Oud-Feyenoord, a team of former Feyenoord players, and living in Brielle.

Honours
Feijenoord
 Eredivisie: 1964–65
 KNVB Cup: 1964–65

References

External links
 
 Profile at feyenoord-online.com

1945 births
Living people
Dutch footballers
Footballers from Rotterdam
Association football forwards
Association football fullbacks
Netherlands international footballers
Eredivisie players
Feyenoord players
NEC Nijmegen players
Sparta Rotterdam players
AS Montferrand Football players
Dutch expatriate footballers
Dutch expatriate sportspeople in France
Expatriate footballers in France